Huntshaw is a village and civil parish located 2.5 north north east of Great Torrington, in the Torridge district, in the county of Devon, England.

In 2011 the population of the civil parish of Huntshaw was 134, although it was 143 in 1901 and 212 in 1801, Huntshaw was in the Fremington hundred.

The parish church of St Mary Magdalene  is Grade II* Listed. There is a mast in Huntshaw called Huntshaw Cross transmitting station.

Other features in Huntshaw include Huntshaw Barton, Berry Castle and Huntshaw Mill Bridge which is Grade II listed, although some of it is in Weare Giffard CP.

History 
The name "Huntshaw" means 'Hun's wood' or 'honey wood', possibly because of the sweetness of the water or swarms of bees in the nearby woods. Huntshaw was recorded in the Domesday Book as Huneseue.

References 

Villages in Devon
Civil parishes in Devon
Torridge District